A mill town, also known as factory town or mill village, is typically a settlement that developed around one or more mills or factories, usually cotton mills or factories producing textiles.

Europe

Italy 

 Crespi d'Adda, UNESCO World Heritage Site
 Nuovo quartiere operaio in Schio
 Villaggio Leumann a Collegno
 Villaggio Frua in Saronno
 Villaggio operaio della Filatura in Tollegno

Poland

Żyrardów

The town grew out of a textile factory founded in 1833 by the sons of Feliks Lubienski, who owned the land where it was built. They brought in a specialist from France and his newly designed machines. He was French inventor, Philippe de Girard from Lourmarin. He became a director of the firm. The factory town developed during the 19th century into a significant textile mill town in Poland.
In honour of Girard, 'Ruda Guzowska' as the original estate was called, was renamed Żyrardów, a toponym derived of the polonised spelling of Girard's name.

Most of Żyrardów's monuments are located in the manufacturing area which dates from the 19th and early 20th centuries. It is widely believed that Żyrardów's textile settlement is the only entire urban industrial complex from the 19th-century to be preserved in Europe.

Russian Empire
 Bogorodsk-Glukhovo factory
 Nikolskoye, Vladimir Governorate

United Kingdom

In the United Kingdom, the term "mill town" usually refers to the 19th century textile manufacturing towns of northern England and the Scottish Lowlands, particularly those in Lancashire (cotton) and Yorkshire (wool).

Some former mill towns have a symbol of the textile industry in their town badge. Some towns may have statues dedicated to textile workers (e.g. Colne) or have a symbol in the badge of local schools (e.g. Ossett School).

The list above includes some towns where textiles was not the predominant industry. For example, mining was a key industry in Wigan and Leigh in Greater Manchester, and in Ossett in Yorkshire.

In thousands of spindles.

On his tour of northern England in 1849, Scottish publisher Angus Reach said:

North America

United States

New England and Northeast

Beginning with Samuel Slater and technological information smuggled out of England by Francis Cabot Lowell, large mills were established in New England in the early to mid 19th century.  Mill towns, sometimes planned, built and owned as a company town, grew in the shadow of the industries. The region became a manufacturing powerhouse along rivers like the Housatonic, Quinebaug, Shetucket, Blackstone, Merrimack, Nashua, Cocheco, Saco, Androscoggin, Kennebec or Winooski.

In the 20th century, alternatives to water power were developed, and it became more profitable for companies to manufacture textiles in southern states where cotton was grown and winters did not require significant heating costs.  Finally, the Great Depression acted as a catalyst that sent several struggling New England firms into bankruptcy.

Midwest

South

Sawmill towns

South America

Colombia
 San José de Suaita

See also
 Company town
 Industrial district
 Blackstone River Valley National Heritage Corridor
 Old Great Falls Historic District, Paterson, NJ

Notes

References

External links

Museums and historic sites 
 Belknap Mill Society Museum, Laconia, NH
 Slater Mill Historic Site, Pawtucket, RI
 Lowell National Historic Park, Lowell, MA
 Lynn Heritage State Park, Lynn, MA
 The Millyard Museum, Manchester, NH
 Quinebaug & Shetucket Rivers Valley National Historic Corridor
 Southern Textile Heritage Corridor, Vir, NC, SC, Ga, Al
 Museum Lewiston-Auburn, Lewiston, ME

Company towns
Industrial Revolution
History of the textile industry
Communities by industry